Diving chess is a sport in which chess is played underwater. It was invented by Etan Ilfeld; and, since 2013, it has been included as one of the disciplines in the annual Mind Sports Olympiad.

Rules 
Diving chess is played at the bottom of a swimming pool, using a chessboard with magnetic chess pieces. The players dive underwater to observe the position and consider and play their move before they resurface to take a breath. When one player resurfaces, it is the turn of the other player to dive.

Such chess games last on average one hour, where the combination of physical and intellectual performance is a challenge: to manage one's oxygen levels while making good chess moves.

Players are not allowed to use any oxygen-supplying device, but they may wear diving masks or swimming goggles. Also, they used to be allowed to use a weight for easier sinking; however, as of 2022, no weights are allowed.

External links 

 Video's of the World Dive Chess Championships in 2016, 2018, 2022
 Website Diving Chess

References 

Chess variants